Matej Andraz Vogrinčič (born  October 12, 1970) is a Slovenian artist. He has been creating site-specific work in urban and natural environments since the early 1990s.  He has built an international reputation by creating installations specific to local places, traditions, and histories – filling the most ordinary or neglected places with even more ordinary objects.  With all his work, Vogrinčič starts with the space but always leaves room to alter and develop the idea in the process. His projects rely on a direct connection with the local community, including clothing and toy car donations.

Vogrinčič first “dressed” a dilapidated house with donated clothing in his hometown and then presented a similar project at the Venice Biennale in 1999.  He created the project “Car Park: Members Only” – a wall installation consisting of 15,000 toy cars placed on a wall of a building in Adelaide, Australia, in response to the city’s traffic and parking problems and continued to the Australian outback, where he put up a watering can installation, consisting of some 2,000 plaster watering cans arranged over the area of a football field in a region largely devoid of rain.  As part of the 2003 Awesome Festival in Perth, Western Australia, he filled up an area of 7,000 square meters with 10,000 balloons of red, orange, blue, pink, green and yellow colors.  He filled the atrium of the former Melbourne GPO with 1000 umbrellas in 2005.  One of his recent projects include Untitled (56 Boats) commissioned for the 4th Liverpool Biennial in England, an installation of 56 upturned boats placed inside the bombed ruins of the Gothic Era St. Luke’s Church. In 2013, Vogrinčič was selected to be part of 'KASHIMA' international artist-in-residence run by the npo BEPPU PROJECT in Beppu, Japan. During the residence he experimented a work in collaboration with Japanese bamboo craft masters and he created the site-specific artwork, 'Rope', in an abandoned hot-spring. He is invited as an artist for a contemporary art triennial called the Beppu Contemporary Art Festival 'Mixed Bathing World' 2015 in Beppu, Japan.

Personal 
Vogrinčič is born in Ljubljana, Slovenia

Projects in Public Spaces

2013 , Beppu, JapanSelected artist for 'KASHIMA' international artist-in-residence program

2007    Untitled (Shovels), Krasnoyarsk, RussiaCommissioned by the Biennial of Siberia

2007    Untitled (It used to be my playground) Farmington Canal New Haven, CT United StatesCommissioned by Site Projects

2006    Untitled (56 Boats) St. Luke’s Church, Liverpool, United Kingdom  Commissioned by Liverpool Biennial

2005    When on a Winter’s Night a Traveller GPO Melbourne, Melbourne, AustraliaCommissioned by L’Oréal Melbourne Fashion Festival and GPO

2004    Untitled (Enchanted Forest) Ljubljana, Slovenia Commissioned by Microsoft

2003    Beach Balls Perth, AustraliaCommissioned by the Awesome Festival

2002    Moon Plain Coober Pedy, Australia
Commissioned by South Australian Tourism Commission

2002    Port Christchurch, New Zealand
Commissioned by Scape: Arts & Industry Urban Arts Festival

2000    Car Park: Members Only Adelaide, Australia

1999    Casa Vestita (Dressed House) Venice, Italy

1997    Street Wear Ljubljana, Slovenia

1993    Dressed House Ljubljana, Slovenia

Selected solo exhibitions

2003    Moon Plain, Museum of Modern Art, Ljubljana, Slovenia

2002    Moon Plain, SOFA Gallery, Christchurch, New Zealand

1999    Clothes Sculpture, John Gibson Gallery, New York, USA

1996    Dressing, Anonimus Gallery, Ljubljana, Slovenia

1992    Ready Made, SKUC Gallery, Ljubljana, Slovenia

Selected group exhibitions

2005    Slovene Art 1995–2005: Territories, Identities, Nets, Museum of Modern Art, Ljubljana, Slovenia

The First Line, 26th Biennale of Graphic Arts, Ljubljana, Slovenia

2004    Slovene Art 1985–1995, Museum of Modern Art, Ljubljana, Slovenia

2002    Art+Industry Biennial, Christchurch, New Zealand

Tancat per Obres (Artists in Architecture) Collegi d’Arquitectes de Catalunya, Barcelona, Spain

1997    U3, Triennial of Slovene Contemporary Art, Museum of Modern Art, Ljubljana, Slovenia

This Art is Recycled, SKUC Gallery, Ljubljana, Slovenia

1996    Urbanaria, SCCA Ljubljana, Ljubljana, Slovenia

Art interventions, performances, films, theatre design

1998    Le Coco Fruitwear Co, commissioned by Biennale of Young European and Mediterranean Artists,     Turin, Italy

Activities of Le Coco Fruitwear Co. continue with new collections and new shows at:

K4 Club, Ljubljana, Slovenia

Kibla Club, Maribor, Slovenia

Institute of Contemporary Art, London

1998 Set designs for Marina Grzinic and Aina Šmid’s video Madame Butterfly Theater, Mladinsko, Ljubljana

1995    Le Coco fruitwear, a manufactory for fruit clothes, Ljubljana Markets, Slovenia

1994    The House, short film with Damjan Kozole, Ljubljana, Slovenia

1994    House Tailor, documentary film with Tibor Ogrizek, Ljubljana, Slovenia

1994    Paints garments and makes fashion accessories for Hej Salvador, a music-fashion performance (directed by Matjaž Pograjc, produced by Glej theatre), Ljubljana, Slovenia

References

External links
 Site Projects
 Casa Vestita

Installation artists
Slovenian artists
1970 births
Living people